Miss F is a 2007 Italian drama film directed by Wilma Labate. A portrait of workers' life in Fiat's system, it entered the "Italian Panorama" section at the 2007 Turin Film Festival.

Plot

Cast 
Filippo Timi: Sergio
Valeria Solarino: Emma
Sabrina Impacciatore: Magda
Fausto Paravidino: Antonio
: Peppino
Giorgio Colangeli: Ciro
Fabrizio Gifuni: Silvio
Clara Bindi: Nonna Martano

See also
 List of Italian films of 2007

References

External links

2001 films
Italian drama films
Films directed by Wilma Labate
Films set in Turin
Films set in 1980
2007 drama films
2007 films
2001 drama films
2000s Italian films